Peter Punk is an Argentine sitcom of children's genre, original Disney XD co-produced with Illusion Studios, broadcast since 2011 by Disney XD. The first trailer was aired in February 2011 on Disney Channel Latin America. It stars Juan Ciancio, Gastón Vietto, Guido Pennelli, Franco Masini and Lucía Pecrul.

Synopsis
Peter is a fifteen-year-old teenager with friends, challenges and a punk family. His only problem is that he likes rock. He has a band called Rock Bones, in which he is the leader, vocalist and bassist. The band is made up of his friends: Seba (the drummer), Mateo (the guitarist), Lola (the sonidist) and Iván (the manager) with whom he spends most of the day. They have pop enemies, the Twin Pop.

Cast
Juan Ciancio as Peter Punk	
Gastón Vietto as Mateo
Guido Pennelli as Seba	
Lucía Pecrul as Lola	
Franco Masini as Iván	
Leo Trento as Vic Punk	
Violeta Naón as Nancy Punk	
Juana Barros as Paty Punk
Lucas Verstraeten as Joe Punk	
Salo Pasik as Ray Punk	
Brian y Joel Cazeneuve as Andy y Michael

References

External links 
 

2011 Argentine television series debuts
Television series by Disney
Disney XD original programming
Disney Channels Worldwide original programming
Spanish-language Disney Channel original programming
Television series about teenagers